"How Do U Want It" is a song by American rapper 2Pac from his fourth studio album, All Eyez on Me (1996). It was released on June 4, 1996 as a double a-sided single with "California Love" from the same album and was his final single to be released during his lifetime. The song features R&B duo K-Ci & JoJo, who at the time were best known as the lead singers of the group Jodeci.  The song reached number one on the U.S. Billboard Hot 100 and number seventeen in the UK in 1996. The song received a Best Rap Performance by a Duo or Group Grammy nomination in 1997. 

Produced by Johnny "J", "How Do U Want It" samples Quincy Jones' 1974 song "Body Heat", and includes a diss towards civil rights activist and fierce rap critic C. Delores Tucker.  Tucker later sued 2Pac's estate, claiming that comments in this song, and on the track "Wonda Why They Call U Bitch" from the same album, inflicted emotional distress, were slanderous, and invaded her privacy.  The case was later dismissed.  A music video was created for "How Do U Want It" and its B-sides "2 of Amerikaz Most Wanted" and "Hit 'Em Up".

Music videos

There were three videos filmed for this song: 
A dirty version and a clean version, both directed by Ron Hightower and produced by Tracy D. Robinson. These two versions are distinguished by music ratings (one is certified adult material). The videos portray a wild sex party with Jacuzzi, mechanical bull riding, cage dancing and pole stripping. The dirty version also features numerous porn stars, including Nina Hartley, Heather Hunter, Nadia Cassini and Angel Kelly.
The third version, known as the concert version, is mostly live on stage (not from the House of Blues live performance). There are cameo appearances by K-Ci & JoJo, and fellow group member of Digital Underground Shock G both in the concert and studio segments.

Track listing
A1. "How Do U Want It" (LP Version)
A2. "California Love" (Long Radio Edit)
B1. "2 of Amerikaz Most Wanted" (LP Version)
B2. "Hit 'Em Up"

Charts

Weekly charts

Year-end charts

Certifications

Albums with the song 
All Eyez on Me
Greatest Hits
Nu-Mixx Klazzics
2Pac Live
Tupac: Live at the House of Blues
The Prophet Returns
Best of 2Pac

See also 
Hot 100 number-one hits of 1996 (USA)

Notes

External links
Interview with Heather Hunter
MVDBase entry
Official Nina Hartley website

1996 singles
Billboard Hot 100 number-one singles
Songs written by Quincy Jones
Tupac Shakur songs
Songs written by Leon Ware
Songs written by Tupac Shakur
1996 songs